The 2022 Legislative Assembly of Krasnodar Krai election took place on 9–11 September 2022, on common election day. All 70 seats in the Legislative Assembly were up for reelection.

Electoral system
Under current election laws, the Legislative Assembly is elected for a term of five years, with parallel voting. 25 seats are elected by party-list proportional representation with a 5% electoral threshold, with the other half elected in 45 single-member constituencies by first-past-the-post voting. Until 2022 the number of mandates allocated in proportional and majoritarian parts were standing at 35 each. Seats in the proportional part are allocated using the Imperiali quota, modified to ensure that every party list, which passes the threshold, receives at least one mandate.

Candidates

Party lists
To register regional lists of candidates, parties need to collect 0.5% of signatures of all registered voters in Krasnodar Krai.

The following parties were relieved from the necessity to collect signatures:
United Russia
Communist Party of the Russian Federation
A Just Russia — Patriots — For Truth
Liberal Democratic Party of Russia
New People

New People will take part in Krasnodar Krai legislative election for the first time, while Communists of Russia, who participated in the 2017 election, did not file its party list in 2022.

Single-mandate constituencies
45 single-mandate constituencies were formed in Krasnodar Krai, an increase of 10 seats since last redistricting in 2017.

To register candidates in single-mandate constituencies need to collect 3% of signatures of registered voters in the constituency.

Results

|- style="background-color:#E9E9E9;text-align:center;"
! rowspan=2 colspan=2| Party
! colspan=5| Party list
! colspan=2| Constituency
! colspan=2| Total
|-
! width="75"| Votes
! %
! ±pp
! Seats
! +/–
! Seats
! +/–
! Seats
! +/–
|-
| style="background-color:;"|
| style="text-align:left;"| United Russia
| 1,636,842
| 70.80
|  0.02%
| 21
|  8
| 41
|  10
| 62
|  2
|-
| style="background-color:;"|
| style="text-align:left;"| Communist Party
| 248,784
| 10.76
|  0.77%
| 2
|  1
| 0
| 
| 2
|  1
|-
| style="background-color:;"|
| style="text-align:left;"| Liberal Democratic Party
| 153,219
| 6.63
|  4.52%
| 1
|  2
| 2
|  2
| 3
|  0
|-
| style="background-color:;"|
| style="text-align:left;"| A Just Russia — For Truth
| 133,522
| 5.78
|  2.32%
| 1
|  1
| 1
|  0
| 2
|  1
|-
| colspan="11" style="background-color:#E9E9E9;"|
|-
| style="background-color:;"|
| style="text-align:left;"| New People
| 112,263
| 4.86
| New
| 0
| New
| 0
| New
| 0
| New
|-
| style="background-color:;"|
| style="text-align:left;"| Party of Growth
| —
| —
| —
| —
| —
| 1
|  0
| 1
|  0
|-
| style="background-color:;"|
| style="text-align:left;"| Rodina
| —
| —
| —
| —
| —
| 0
| New
| 0
| New
|-
| style="background-color:;"|
| style="text-align:left;"| Civic Platform
| —
| —
| —
| —
| —
| 0
| New
| 0
| New
|-
| style="text-align:left;" colspan="2"| Invalid ballots
| 27,438
| 1.19
|  0.35%
| —
| —
| —
| —
| —
| —
|- style="font-weight:bold"
| style="text-align:left;" colspan="2"| Total
| 2,312,070
| 100.00
| —
| 25
|  10
| 45
|  10
| 70
| 
|-
| colspan="11" style="background-color:#E9E9E9;"|
|-
| style="text-align:left;" colspan="2"| Turnout
| 2,312,070
| 53.31
|  11.28%
| —
| —
| —
| —
| —
| —
|-
| style="text-align:left;" colspan="2"| Registered voters
| 4,336,930
| 100.00
| —
| —
| —
| —
| —
| —
| —
|-
| colspan="11" style="background-color:#E9E9E9;"|
|- style="font-weight:bold"
| colspan="10" |Source:
|
|}

Legislative Assembly Deputy Speaker Aleksandr Trembitsky (United Russia) was appointed to the Federation Council, replacing incumbent Vladimir Beketov (United Russia).

See also
2022 Russian regional elections

References

Krasnodar Krai
Politics of Krasnodar Krai
Regional legislative elections in Russia